Synchronism may refer to:

 Synchronism (Davidovsky), compositions by Argentine-American composer Mario Davidovsky incorporating acoustic instruments and electroacoustic sounds
 Chronological synchronism, an event that links two chronologies such as historical and datable astronomical events
 Synchronization, the coordination of events to operate a system in unison

Film 
 Synchronized sound, film sound technologically coupled to image 
 Post-synchronization, the process of re-recording dialogue after the filming process

See also
 Synchromism an early 20th-century art movement, commonly misspelled as "synchronism"
Synchronicity (disambiguation)
Synchronizer (disambiguation)
Synchrony (disambiguation)

Synchronization